Bucey-en-Othe is a commune in the Aube department in north-central France.

Population

Sights and monuments
 Château de Bucey-en-Othe: 16th century castle listed since 2005 as a monument historique by the French Ministry of Culture.

See also
Communes of the Aube department

References

Communes of Aube
Aube communes articles needing translation from French Wikipedia